Clyde Eugene Sowell (December 22, 1931 – July 22, 1989) was an American Negro league pitcher in the 1940s.

A native of Andalusia, Alabama, Sowell played for the Baltimore Elite Giants in 1948. He died in Brundidge, Alabama in 1989 at age 57.

References

External links
 and Seamheads

1931 births
1989 deaths
Baltimore Elite Giants players
Baseball pitchers
Baseball players from Alabama
People from Andalusia, Alabama
20th-century African-American sportspeople